Qianlong Dynasty is a Chinese television series based on the novel Qianlong Huangdi (乾隆皇帝; The Qianlong Emperor) by Eryue He. The series was preceded by Yongzheng Dynasty in 1997 and Kangxi Dynasty in 2001, both of which were also based on Eryue He's novels.

Cast
 Jiao Huang as the Qianlong Emperor
 Chen Rui as Heshen
 Zuo Xiaoqing as the Tenth Princess
 Yong Mei as Qinglian
 Li Xinmin as Liu Yong
 Qian Xuege as Zhu Gui
 Jia Yiping as Yongyan
 Sha Yi as Fengshen Yinde
 Su Mao as E'sente
 Wang Xiaozhu as Pudaozhao
 Jia Zhaoji as Liu Quan
 Wang Hui as Yongxin
 Liang Wei as Yonglian
 Liu Weiming as Ji Xiaolan
 Yang Hongtao as Gao Yuncong
 Xiu Zongdi as Wang Danwang
 Zeng Jing as Chen Huizu
 Zheng Yu as Qian Feng
 Li Yun as Empress Ula Nara
 Lisa Lu as Empress Dowager Chongqing
 Zhou Chuan as Hongzhou
 Yu Liwen as Su Ji
 Dong Ziwu as Hailancha
 Nige Mutu as Zhaohui
 Zhou Zongyin as Huang Kun
 Zhang Xiaopei / Zhang Lanlan as Huang Xing'er
 Anatoly Shanin as George Macartney

2003 Chinese television series debuts
Television series set in the Qing dynasty
Mandarin-language television shows
Television shows based on Chinese novels
Chinese historical television series
Qianlong Emperor